Ormeley Lodge is a Grade II* listed  early 18th-century Georgian house, set in  on the edge of  Ham Common, near to Richmond Park in Ham, London. It is owned by Lady Annabel Goldsmith.

Description
Bridget Cherry and Nikolaus Pevsner describe the house as "exquisite" and point out the "[b]eautiful doorway with Corinthian pilasters and a frieze carved with cherubs' heads and palm leaves" and the "[o]utstandingly fine wrought-iron gatepiers, gates and railings".

The house, together with the gates and railings, has been Grade II* listed since 1950. The grounds include a tennis court and swimming pool. The gardens are occasionally open to the public as part of the National Gardens Scheme.

History
The house was built on the site of a former cottage in about 1715 by Thomas Hammond, son of a wealthy landowner from Teddington. At about the same time John Campbell, 2nd Duke of Argyll began establishing the neighbouring Sudbrook Lodge and estate. Charles Townshend, second husband to Caroline, one of Campbell's four daughters, bought Ormeley Lodge in 1763 as a country retreat and they lived there until 1767, moving to Sudbrook Lodge on the death of the Dowager Duchess of Argyll.

A claim that the house was the honeymoon destination of George, Prince of Wales and Maria Fitzherbert on 15 December 1785, following their secret marriage, has not been substantiated.

Between 1814 and 1819 the house was one of the homes of Sir John Sinclair, President of the Board of Agriculture and whose fourth daughter, Catherine Sinclair, was a notable writer of children's fiction. In 1817 a footpath was built from the Petersham Road passing in front of the Lodge and leading to Ham Gate Lodge at the entrance to Richmond Park. Named Barnard's Footpath after its benefactor, it was known as Park Road by 1861 and was renamed Ham Gate Avenue in 1945. Later the house was occupied by Lauchlan Mackinnon, a captain in the Royal Navy who wrote three books about his experiences.

The house was bought in 1893 by Charles Hanbury-Tracy, 4th Baron Sudeley and his wife, Ada, daughter of Frederick Tollemache, living there until Charles' death in 1922. Their youngest son Felix, who was killed in action in 1914 is commemorated on a memorial in nearby St Andrew's Church, Ham. Their second son Algernon died in 1915 and is buried at St Peter's Church, Petersham.  
 
The house's link to the Earls of Dysart, to whom Townshend, Sinclair and Hanbury-Tracy had all been connected by marriage, was broken in 1949 when the Tollemache family auctioned the Ham estates. Ormeley Lodge was purchased by antique dealer Ronald Lee. Lee held a loan exhibition entitled Masterpieces of British Art and Craftsmanship in the house in 1954, which was attended by The Queen Mother. Later that year Lee sold the house to the Earl of Westmorland and in 1964 it was sold to Lord and Lady Howard de Walden.

Ormeley Lodge was subsequently purchased by Sir James Goldsmith in the mid-1970s, and, with Lady Annabel Goldsmith, it became home for their family of five children, the elder three from Annabel's first marriage; Rupert, Robin and India, Jemima and Zac, and a sixth, Ben, being born after the move.

References

External links 
 Drawing of Ormeley Lodge, 1941 by Wilfred Fairclough at the Victoria and Albert Museum 
 Drawing of Ormeley Lodge by Richard Cooper II at the British Museum
 Bird's eye view of the house and its grounds
 Photos of Ormeley Lodge at Ham Photos blog

1710s establishments in England
Country houses in London
Grade II* listed houses in London
Ham, London
Houses in the London Borough of Richmond upon Thames